Sirat al-Nabi is a 7-volume seerah book, or biography of the Islamic prophet Muhammad, which was written by Shibli Nomani and Sulaiman Nadvi. This is Shibli Nomani's latest and most popular work.

References

External links 

1918 non-fiction books
Books by Shibli Nomani
Deobandi literature
1918 books
Biographies of Muhammad
Books by Sulaiman Nadvi